Peter Gordon Klein is an American economist who studies managerial and organizational issues. Klein holds the W. W. Caruth Endowed Chair and is a professor of entrepreneurship at Baylor University's Hankamer School of Business, where he is also Chair of the Department of Entrepreneurship and Corporate Innovation. Klein is Academic Director of the Baugh Center for Entrepreneurship and Free Enterprise, adjunct professor of strategy and management at the Norwegian School of Economics, and Carl Menger Research Fellow at the Mises Institute. He serves as associated editor for Strategic Entrepreneurship Journal and associate editor of The Independent Review. His 2012 book Organizing Entrepreneurial Judgment (with Nicolai Foss, Cambridge University Press) won the 2014 Foundation for Economic Education Best Book Prize and has been translated into Polish and Persian. His 2010 book The Capitalist and the Entrepreneur (Mises Institute) has been translated into Chinese and Portuguese. He holds an honorary professorship at the Beijing University of Information Science and Technology.

Specialization
Klein specializes in organizational economics, strategy, and entrepreneurship, with applications to corporate diversification, organizational design, and innovation. His books include Entrepreneurship and the Firm: Austrian Perspectives on Economic Organization (edited with Nicolai J. Foss, Edward Elgar, 2002), The Fortunes of Liberalism, volume 4 of The Collected Works of F. A. Hayek (University of Chicago Press, 1992), The Capitalist and the Entrepreneur: Essays on Organizations and Markets (Mises Institute, 2010), and Organizing Entrepreneurial Judgment: A New Approach to the Firm (with Nicolai J. Foss, Cambridge University Press, 2011).

During the 2000–2001 academic year, Klein was a senior economist on the Council of Economic Advisers.

In 2012, he authored an article entitled "Entrepreneurs and Creative Destruction" in The 4% Solution: Unleashing the Economic Growth America Needs, published by the George W. Bush Presidential Center.

Teaching career
Klein taught previously at the University of California, Berkeley, the University of Georgia, the Copenhagen Business School, and the Olin Business School. He received his Ph.D. in economics from the University of California, Berkeley, studying under 2009 Nobel Laureate Oliver E. Williamson, and his B.A. from the University of North Carolina, Chapel Hill.
Klein is currently the faculty advisor for Baylor's Young American's For Liberty chapter.

References

External links
 Video interview of Peter G. Klein on "Entrepreneurship and the Capitalist Society"
 Organizations and Markets
 
 
 Homepage at the University of Missouri
 Austrian Economics Newsletter Interview (1995)

1966 births
Living people
University of Missouri faculty
University of California, Berkeley alumni
University of North Carolina at Chapel Hill alumni
21st-century American economists
Austrian School economists
American libertarians
American organizational theorists
Mises Institute people